Crooked River State Park is a  Georgia state park located near St. Mary's on the south bank of the Crooked River, providing an excellent coastal setting.  The park is dedicated to the preservation of its natural resources and public education. The park is near the ruins of the McIntosh Sugarworks, built around 1825 and used as a starch factory during the American Civil War.  It is the closest state park to Cumberland Island National Seashore and it is adjacent to the Naval Submarine Base Kings Bay.

History
The earliest residents of Crooked River State Park were the Guale and the Timucua Indians who were pushed out and moved southward in the 1700s. Once a Royal Land Grant, Crooked River State Park was confiscated at the end of the revolution and owned by Robert Montfort. In 1792 Alexander Elliot purchased the area of the park known today as Elliott’s Bluff. Records indicate in 1824 John H. McIntosh owned Mush Bluff, south of the park and Elliot’s Bluff. Evidence of this plantation era and earlier times remain on the park’s grounds including old bottles, planted pines, and oyster shell middens found along marsh edge on east side of park. The unofficial opening day of Crooked River State Park was March 27, 1947.

Facilities
52 tent/trailer/RV campsites
11 Cottages
4 Picnic Shelters
2 Group Shelters
1 Pioneer Campground
Public access boat ramp

External links
Crooked River State Park, Georgia State Parks
Georgia's Coast in photographs and more

References

State parks of Georgia (U.S. state)
Protected areas of Camden County, Georgia
St. Marys, Georgia